Aït Melloul is a city on the west coast of Morocco. It is located in the suburban area of Agadir just southeast of Inezgane, on the southern bank of the Sous River. According to the 2014 population census, the city is home to 171,847 inhabitants and 39,697 households. The city is part of the Inezgane-Aït Melloul prefecture in the administrative subdivision of Ait Melloul.

Climate 
Ait Melloul is characterized with a mild and temperate climate in general, sometimes hot and dry. The climate of the city is influenced by the air currents from the Atlantic Ocean. Dry currents from the south and hot winds from the Sahara also influence the climate and temperature of the city.

Transport

Air 
Ait Melloul is home for Al Massira international airport which is one of the busiest airports in the south of Morocco.

Sports 
The largest football club of the city is Union Aït Melloul which is playing in the second division of the Moroccan football league. The team plays at the municipal stadium of Ait Melloul which can host up to 5,000 fans.

Notable natives and residents 

 Walid Azaro, professional footballer.

Gallery

See also 

 Al Massira Airport
 Union Aït Melloul
 Prefecture of Inezgane-Aït Melloul

References

External links 

Populated places in Inezgane-Aït Melloul Prefecture
Municipalities of Morocco